Ronald Halpin is a Canadian public servant and diplomat. He is Canada's ambassador to Hungary. He has also served as ambassador to Slovakia.

Halpin earned a Bachelor of Arts, Honours at the Royal Military College of Canada in 1971. He served a number of years of military service, including peacekeeper duties in Cyprus. He suffered a severe stroke on November 14, 2003, while he was Ambassador to the Republic of Hungary.

He served as a foreign affairs officer in Canadian embassies in Pretoria, Moscow and Warsaw. He also served as a foreign affairs officer in External Affairs Headquarters, Political and Strategic Analysis Division, the USSR and Eastern Europe Relations Division and the Personnel Division.

Halpin is married to Françoise Halpin (née Lacasse) and they have two children.

References

Year of birth missing (living people)
Living people
Royal Military College of Canada alumni
Ambassadors of Canada to Hungary
Ambassadors of Canada to Slovenia
Ambassadors of Canada to the Czech Republic
Ambassadors of Canada to Slovakia